Marquess of Borghetto is a hereditary title in the peerage of Spain, granted originally in the peerage of Parma to Catalina de Bassecourt, by Philip I of Parma, member of the Spanish royal family and younger brother of Charles III of Spain, on July 1765.

Catalina de Bassecourt was the honorary lady-in-waiting of Elisabeth Farnese, Queen of Spain as wife of Philip V and mother of the Duke of Parma, and later of María Luisa of Parma.

In 1903, Alfonso XIII recognised it as a title of the Kingdom and peerage of Spain, issuing a Royal Decree in favour of Felipe Morenés y García-Alessón, in memory of his ancestors' parmesan title.

Marquesses of Borghetto (1765)

Catalina de Bassecourt y Thieulaine, 1st Marchioness of Borghetto
Francisco González de Bassecourt, 2nd Marquess of Borghetto
Felipe María Pinel y González Ladrón de Guevara y Bassecourt, 3rd Marquess of Borghetto
Antonio María Pinel y Ceballos, 4th Marquess of Borghetto
María de la Concepción Pinel y Ceballos, 5th Marchioness of Borghetto
Carlos García-Alessón y Pinel de Monroy, 6th Marquess of Borghetto
María Fernanda García-Alessón y Pardo de Rivadeneyra, 7th Marchioness of Borghetto
Felipe Morenés y García-Alessón, 8th Marquess of Borghetto
Felipe Morenés y Medina, 9th Marquess of Borghetto
Carlos Morenés y Mariátegui, 10th Marquess of Borghetto

See also
Philip, Duke of Parma

References

Lists of Spanish nobility